This is a comprehensive discography of Mayhem, a black metal band formed in 1984 in Oslo, Norway. Mayhem has released six studio albums, five live albums, two EPs, five demos and singles, three compilation albums and four video albums.

Studio albums

Live albums

EPs

Demos and singles

Rarities

 War and Sodomy: track incorporated later into Ye Entrancemperium by Emperor.
 Visual Aggression: cover of Celtic Frost
 Anno Vampyr
 Into the Lifeless: bonus track on Japanese edition of Esoteric Warfare, originally from the Budapest Sessions (a scrapped album) 
 From Beyond the Event Horizon: also taken from the Budapest Sessions. It is the B-side on the 2014 Psywar single.

Compilation albums

Box sets

Videography

 A film, Lords of Chaos (based on the book of the same name), which focuses on Mayhem, premiered at the Sundance Film Festival in 2018. Mayhem gave permission to director Jonas Åkerlund to use their music.

References

External links
Mayhem's official website

Heavy metal group discographies
Discographies of Norwegian artists
Discography